Paramongaia  is a genus of South American plants  in the Amaryllis family, found only in Peru and Bolivia. Common name is "giant Peruvian daffodil."

There are two recognized species:

Paramongaia superba Ravenna - Bolivia (La Paz)
Paramongaia weberbaueri Velarde - Peru (Ancash), Bolivia (La Paz)

References

External links
Rare Plants, Pamianthe (Peruvian Daffodil) & Paramongaia (Peruvian Daffodil)
Bulb Maven, Paramongaia weberbauerii

Amaryllidaceae genera
Amaryllidoideae